Quentin Bell (born 1987/88) is an activist for transgender rights in the African-American LGBT community. He is the co-founder and executive director of The Knights and Orchids Society, a non-profit based in Selma, Alabama that is led by and provides healthcare services to Black trans, queer, and gender non-conforming people.

Work and activism
Bell co-founded The Knights and Orchids Society in 2012 with his wife Jennine. The organization evolved from a fraternity that Bell founded at Alabama State University in 2009. The nonprofit provides free gender-affirming health and wellness services, with priority given to Black trans people.

Bell has spoken out on state bills that affect transgender rights, including access to restrooms and healthcare for trans children.

Education and personal life
Bell received a Bachelor's degree in Business Administration from Alabama State University. He graduated from the Stanford LGBTQ Executive Leadership Program in 2019.

Bell, a trans man, underwent gender transition in his late 20s. He and his wife Jennine live in Selma with their children.

Awards and honors
 2017: Community Grantmaking Fellow, Trans Justice Funding Project

 2019: Champion of Pride, The Advocate

 2020: Victory Empowerment Fellow, Victory Institute

 2022: Time 100 Next 2022 List, Time magazine

References

External links
The Knights & Orchids Society

1980s births
Living people
Year of birth uncertain
Activists from Selma, Alabama

Alabama State University alumni
LGBT African Americans
Transgender men
Transgender rights activists